Animotion is the self-titled debut album from Los Angeles synthpop sextet Animotion. It was released in 1984 on Mercury Records and features the group's biggest hit single, "Obsession".

Later in 1984, the album was released in Canada as The Language of Attraction, omitting the song "Turn Around".

Canadian release
The album was released in Canada with the title The Language of Attraction. The song "Turn Around" was not included on this version, and "Run to Me" (track #8 on the original version) was moved up track 4 in its place. By the time of The Language of Attractions release, keyboardist Greg Smith was listed as an official band member in the credits, while Paul Antonelli is simply listed as an "additional musical contributor."

Chart performance
The album spent 17 weeks on the US Billboard 200 album charts and reached its peak position of number 28 in May 1985.

Track listing
All songs written by Bill Wadhams, except where noted.

"Obsession" (Michael Des Barres, Holly Knight) – 5:34
"Let Him Go" – 4:16
"Everything's Leading to You" – 4:42
"Turn Around" – 3:54
"Fun Fun Fun" – 3:44
"Tremble" (Jason Ball) – 4:32
"Holding You" – 4:40
"Run to Me" (Rick Neigher, Wadhams) – 4:13
"Open Door" (Don Kirkpatrick, Wadhams) – 4:05

Personnel
Animotion
 Astrid Plane – vocals
 Paul Antonelli – keyboards
 Bill Wadhams – guitars, vocals
 Don Kirkpatrick – guitars
 Charles Ottavio – bass guitar
 Frenchy O'Brien – drums, percussion

Additional personnel
 Gary Chang – synthesizers
 Greg Smith – keyboards
 Holly Knight – Fairlight programming
 Stevie Fryette – guitars
 Dennis Belfield – bass guitar
 Jeff Stern – drums

Production
 John Ryan – producer 
 Jeff Harris – recording 
 Bob Schaper – engineer, mixing 
 Chris Minto – engineer 
 Russ Bracher – assistant engineer 
 Tim Dennen – assistant engineer 
 Greg Fulginiti – mastering at Artisan Sound Recorders
 Shannon Pasternak – album coordinator 
 Bill Levy – art direction 
 Steeleworks – design 
 Richard E. Aaron – photography 
 Larry Ross – management

 Track 1 published by Pacific Island Publishing c/o Career Music & Makiki Publishing c/o Arista Music Inc.  Tracks 2-5, 7 & 9  published by Big Wad.  Track 6 published by Zone R Music/Big Wad.  Track 8 published by Big Wad & Vogue Music c/o The Welk Music Group.

References

1984 debut albums
Animotion albums
Mercury Records albums
Albums recorded at Sound City Studios